Miss World Spain 2018 was the 6th edition of the Miss World Spain pageant, held on September 15, 2018. The winner was Amaia Izar Leache Larumbe of Navarre and she represented Spain in Miss World 2018.

Final results

Official Delegates

Notes

Returns
Last competed in 2011:
 Ceuta

Withdrawals
 Burgos
 Canary Islands

Did not compete
 Aragón
 Galicia

References

External links

Miss Spain
2018 in Spain
2018 beauty pageants